Robert James Keen (October 25, 1923 – May 29, 1992) was an American flying ace in the 56th Fighter Group during World War II. He retired from the United States Air Force in 1972, after 30 years of distinguished service.

Military career
He enlisted in the U.S. Army Reserve on June 3, 1942, and on November 13, he entered the Aviation Cadet Program of the U.S. Army Air Forces. He was commissioned a second lieutenant and awarded his pilot wings on August 30, 1943.

World War II

After completing his training in the P-47 Thunderbolt, Keen was assigned to the 61st Fighter Squadron of the 56th Fighter Group at RAF Halesworth in January 1944. He scored his first aerial victories on May 13, when he shot down three Focke-Wulf Fw 190s and one probable shootdown of an Fw 190 over Hagenow, Germany, while protecting a formation of B-17 Flying Fortresses. For his actions, Keen was awarded the Distinguished Service Cross.

He scored his final aerial victories on July 5, when he shot down three Messerschmitt Bf 109s over Évreux, France, thus becoming a flying ace.

During World War II, Keen was credited with the destruction of 7 enemy aircraft in aerial combat plus 1 damaged, and 7 destroyed on the ground while strafing enemy airfields. Initially he was credited with only 6 aerial victories until the Air Force Historical Research Agency revised his one probable aerial victory on May 13, 1944, to confirmed in 2002. While serving with the 56th FG, he flew P-47s bearing the name "Ice Cold Kattie".

Post war
After United States Army Air Forces became United States Air Force, Keen attended aerial gunnery schools and served as a fighter pilot at various air bases. He promoted to rank of major on September 1, 1951, before serving as an F-84 Thunderjet pilot and commander of the 307th Strategic Fighter Squadron of the 31st Strategic Fighter Wing at Turner Air Force Base in Georgia, from June 1952 to March 1954.

From August 1957 to August 1961, he attended and served in the staff of the Air Command and Staff College at Maxwell Air Force Base in Alabama. He later attended Army War College at Carlisle Barracks in Pennsylvania, from August 1961 to July 1962. Throughout the 1950s and 1960s, Keen served in various operations and staff positions within the United States Air Force, including serving in overseas such as operations staff officer in headquarters of the U.S. Air Forces in Europe at Lindsey Air Station in West Germany, from July 1962 to August 1965, and chief of the Emergency Actions Element with the 314th Air Division at Osan Air Base in South Korea, from April 1969 to June 1970.

His final positions were as assistant chief of the Current Operations Division, and director of Command and Control at the headquarters of the Ninth Air Force at Shaw Air Force Base in South Carolina. Keen retired from the Air Force with the rank of lieutenant colonel on December 31, 1972.

Later life
Keen was married to Catherine Mae, née Forshee (1925–2014). The couple had a son and a daughter.

Keen died on May 29, 1992, at the age of 68, due to leukemia. He was buried at the Evergreen Memorial Park in Sumter, South Carolina.

Awards and decorations
His awards include:

Distinguished Service Cross citation

Keen, Robert J.
Second Lieutenant, U.S. Army Air Forces
61st Fighter Squadron, 56th Fighter Group, 8th Air Force
Date of Action:  May 13, 1944

Citation:

The President of the United States of America, authorized by Act of Congress July 9, 1918, takes pleasure in presenting the Distinguished Service Cross to Second Lieutenant (Air Corps) Robert James Keen, United States Army Air Forces, for extraordinary heroism in connection with military operations against an armed enemy while serving as Pilot of a P-47 Fighter Airplane in the 61st Fighter Squadron, 56th Fighter Group, Eighth Air Force, in aerial combat against enemy forces on 13 May 1944, in the European Theater of Operations. On this date Lieutenant Keen alone with his flight of fighter aircraft, unmindful of the overwhelming odds, courageously attacked 30 FW 190's, which were positioning for a pass at a box of B-17 bombers, and immediately destroyed one. So closely did he press his attack that no sooner had he set his sights on another enemy and fired than the German bailed out. Lieutenant Keen now found himself separated from his flight, yet despite the fact that he was alone, deep in enemy territory and surrounded by hostile planes he disregarded his personal safety and engaged and destroyed two more FW 190's. So great was his will to destroy the enemy that he refused to disengage from the enemy until his final rounds of ammunition were expended. The skill, aggressiveness and heroism displayed by Lieutenant Keen on this occasion reflect great credit upon himself and the Armed Forces of the United States.

Footnotes

References

1923 births
1992 deaths
Deaths from leukemia
Age controversies
People from Jacksonville, Florida
Military personnel from Florida
Aviators from Florida
Recipients of the Distinguished Service Cross (United States)
Recipients of the Distinguished Flying Cross (United States)
Recipients of the Meritorious Service Medal (United States)
Recipients of the Air Medal
United States Army Air Forces officers
United States Air Force officers
United States Army Air Forces pilots of World War II
American World War II flying aces
United States Army War College alumni
Burials in South Carolina
Catholics from Florida
Deaths from cancer in the United States